Acraea eltringhami is a butterfly in the family Nymphalidae. It is found in western Uganda, Rwanda, Burundi and the Democratic Republic of the Congo (from the eastern part of the country to Kivu).

Taxonomy
It is a member of the Acraea terpsicore  species group   -   but see also Pierre & Bernaud, 2014

Etymology
The name honours the English entomologist Harry Eltringham.

References

External links

Acraea eltringhami Le Site des Acraea de Dominique Bernaud
Images representing Acraea eltringhami at Bold
Acraea eltringhami at Pteron

Butterflies described in 1921
eltringhami